José Sambolin (born 16 July 1958) is a Puerto Rican sailor. He competed in the Finn event at the 1992 Summer Olympics.

References

External links
 

1958 births
Living people
Puerto Rican male sailors (sport)
Olympic sailors of Puerto Rico
Sailors at the 1992 Summer Olympics – Finn
Place of birth missing (living people)